Cutaneous perforating disorders include the following:

 Acquired perforating dermatosis (Acquired perforating collagenosis)
 Kyrle disease
 Perforating folliculitis

See also 
 List of cutaneous conditions

References

External links 

Conditions of the skin appendages